The New Age is the ninth studio album by Canned Heat, released in 1973. It was the first album to feature the talents of James Shane and Ed Beyer. Clara Ward also appears on the album in her last recording.  Influential rock critic Lester Bangs was fired from Rolling Stone for writing a "disrespectful" review of this album upon its release.

Track listing 
 "Keep It Clean" (Richard Hite) - 2:46
 "Harley Davidson Blues" (James Shane) - 2:38
 "Don't Deceive Me" (Hite) - 3:12
 "You Can Run, But You Sure Can't Hide" (Ed Beyer) - 3:15
 "Lookin' for My Rainbow" (Shane) - 5:24
 "Rock and Roll Music" (Hite) - 2:29
 "Framed" (Jerry Leiber and Mike Stoller) - 5:07
 "Election Blues" (Beyer) - 6:04
 "So Long Wrong" (Shane) - 5:36

Personnel
Canned Heat
Bob Hite – lead vocals (tracks 1, 4, 6-8); backing vocals (track 2)
Henry Vestine – lead guitar (tracks 1-4, 6, 7, 9)
James Shane – rhythm guitar (tracks 2, 4, 6, 7); lead guitar (track 9); dobro (track 5); slide dobro (track 8); bass (tracks 1, 3); backing vocals (tracks 1, 4); lead vocals (tracks 2, 5, 9)
Ed Beyer - keyboards (all tracks) 
Richard Hite – bass (tracks 2, 4-7, 9); string bass (track 8); rhythm guitar (tracks 1, 3); tuba (track 4); backing vocals (tracks 1, 4); lead vocals (track 3)
Adolfo de la Parra – drums (tracks 1-4, 6, 7, 9)

Additional personnel
 Clara Ward - vocals (track 5)

Production
 Skip Taylor - producer
 John Stronach - engineer

References

Canned Heat albums
1973 albums
United Artists Records albums